Thomas Gardiner may refer to:
 Thomas Gardiner (publisher) (1826–1899), American newspaper publisher
 Thomas Gardiner (Royalist) (1591–1652), English lawyer and politician
Thomas Gardiner (monk), monk of Westminster
Thomas Gardiner (MP) (1525/26-at least 85), MP for Mitchell
Tom Gardiner (born 1962), American soccer player
 Thomas A. Gardiner (1832–1881), American politician from New York

See also
Thomas Gardiner Corcoran (1900–1981), U.S. New Deal official
Thomas Gardner (disambiguation)
Thomas Gardener (died 1409), MP